The Institute of Electrical and Electronics Engineers IEEE Sensors Council Meritorious Service Award recognizes outstanding long-term service with dedication, effort and contribution to the IEEE Sensor Council.

Recipients
2020: Srinivas Tadigadapa
2019
2018: Yu-Cheng Lin
2017: Anil K. Roy
2016: {Award not given}
2015: Vladimir J. Lumelsky
2014: Ignacio R. Matias
2013: Christina M. Schober
2012: Lina Sarro
2011: Tom Wiener
2010: Michiel Vellekoop
2009: None
2008: Bob Bannon
2007: John Vig

References

IEEE society and council awards